The Scofield Reference Bible is a widely circulated study Bible edited and annotated by the American Bible student Cyrus I. Scofield, which popularized dispensationalism at the beginning of the 20th century. Published by Oxford University Press and containing the entire text of the traditional, Protestant King James Version, it first appeared in 1909 and was revised by the author in 1917.

Features and legacy

The Scofield Bible had several innovative features. Most important, it printed what amounted to a commentary on the biblical text alongside the Bible instead of in a separate volume, the first to do so in English since the Geneva Bible (1560). It also contained a cross-referencing system that tied together related verses of Scripture and allowed a reader to follow biblical themes from one chapter and book to another (so called "chain references"). Finally, the 1917 edition also attempted to date events of the Bible. It was in the pages of the Scofield Reference Bible that many Christians first encountered Archbishop James Ussher's calculation of the date of Creation as 4004 BC; and through discussion of Scofield's notes, which advocated the "gap theory," fundamentalists began a serious internal debate about the nature and chronology of creation.

The first edition of the Scofield Bible (1909) was published only a few years before World War I, a war that destroyed a cultural optimism that had viewed the world as entering a new era of peace and prosperity; then the post-World War II era witnessed the creation in Palestine of a homeland for the Jews. Thus, Scofield's premillennialism seemed prophetic. "At the popular level, especially, many people came to regard the dispensationalist scheme as completely vindicated." Sales of the Reference Bible exceeded two million copies by the end of World War II.

The Scofield Reference Bible promoted dispensationalism, the belief that between creation and the final judgment there would be seven distinct eras of God's dealing with man and that these eras are a framework for synthesizing the message of the Bible. Largely through the influence of Scofield's notes, many fundamentalist Christians in the United States adopted a dispensational theology. Scofield's notes on the Book of Revelation are a major source for the various timetables, judgments, and plagues elaborated on by popular religious writers such as Hal Lindsey, Edgar C. Whisenant, and Tim LaHaye; and in part because of the success of the Scofield Reference Bible, twentieth-century American fundamentalists placed greater stress on eschatological speculation.

Later editions
 The 1917 Scofield Reference Bible notes are now in the public domain, and the 1917 edition is "consistently the best selling edition of the Scofield Bible" in the United Kingdom and Ireland. In 1967, Oxford University Press published a revision of the Scofield Bible with a slightly modernized KJV text, and a muting of some of the tenets of Scofield's theology. Recent editions of the KJV Scofield Study Bible have moved the textual changes made in 1967 to the margin. The Press continues to issue editions under the title Oxford Scofield Study Bible, and there are translations into French, German, Spanish, and Portuguese. For instance, the French edition published by the Geneva Bible Society is printed with a revised version of the Louis Segond translation that includes additional notes by a Francophone committee.

In the 21st century, Oxford University Press published Scofield notes to accompany six additional English translations.

References

Further reading
Arno C. Gaebelein, The History of the Scofield Reference Bible (Our Hope Publications, 1943)
William E. Cox, Why I Left Scofieldism (Phillipsburg, N.J.: Presbyterian and Reformed Publishing Co., 1975)  
R. Todd Mangum and Mark S. Sweetnam, The Scofield Bible: Its History and Impact on the Evangelical Church (Colorado Springs: Paternoster Publishing, 2009)

External links
The KJV Scofield® Study Bible III 2003
The Scofield reference Bible. The Holy Bible, containing the Old and New Testaments 1917
Scofield Reference Bible Notes at Wikisource
Searchable text of the 1917 version of the  Scofield Reference Bible reference notes.

1909 non-fiction books
20th-century Christian texts
Study Bibles
Christian fundamentalism
King James Version editions
1909 in Christianity
Oxford University Press books